Kai Henrik Twilfer (born 1976, Gelsenkirchen, West Germany) is a German merchant and author.

Early life
Kai Twilfer studied economics in Bochum. While a student, he founded a production company for advertising movies. Apart from that, he worked at Westdeutscher Rundfunk in Cologne. In 2002 he founded a wholesale company for regional gift merchandise from the Ruhr region. He is the managing director of the Industriekult-Verlags GmbH.

Career 
In February 2013, he published his first book entitled Schantall, tu ma die Omma winken! (Schantall, go ahead and wave at Grandma) through Schwarzkopf & Schwarzkopf, which became a bestseller. In this book, using satire, he describes the experiences of a social worker named Jochen (given name), concerning the fictitious lower-class family "Pröllmann". His attempts to establish education fail spectacularly. The book was an online book report number one seller during 2013.

Publications
 Together with Susanne Granas (Illustrator): . Schwarzkopf & Schwarzkopf, Berlin 2013, . Translated title: “Schantall, go ahead and wave at Grandma! From the everyday life of a fearless social worker“
 111 Gründe, den Ruhrpott zu lieben. Eine Liebeserklärung an die großartigste Region der Welt. Schwarzkopf & Schwarzkopf, Berlin 2013, . Translated title: “111 Reasons to love the Ruhr region. A declaration of love for the greatest region in the world”
 Schantall, tu ma die Omma Prost sagen! Neues aus dem Alltag des unerschrockenen Sozialarbeiters. Schwarzkopf & Schwarzkopf, Berlin 2014, . Translated title: “Schantall, go ahead and tell Grandma Cheers! The latest news from the everyday life of a fearless social worker”
 As an audio book: Schantall, tu ma die Omma Prost sagen! Neues aus dem Alltag des unerschrockenen Sozialarbeiters. Schwarzkopf & Schwarzkopf, Berlin 2014, .
 Schantall, tu ma die Omma Tschüss rufen! Unglaubliches aus dem Alltag des unerschrockenen Sozialarbeiters. Schwarzkopf & Schwarzkopf, Berlin 2016, . Translated title: “Schantall, go ahead and wave Grandma good-bye! Unbelievable information from the everyday life of a fearless social worker”
 Finn-Luca, komm bei Fuß! Der verrückte Familienhorror von nebenan. Fischer Taschenbuch, Frankfurt am Main 2016, . Translated title: “Finn-Luca, heel! The crazy family-horror next door”.
 Ich hab keine Macken! Das sind Special Effects. Bastei Lübbe, Köln 2017, . Translated title: “I don’t have any faults! These are special effects”.

See also
German Kevinism

References

External links

 
 Kai Twilfer’s homepage
 Antonia Lange: Kai Twilfter and his second part of “Ruhr-region-Schantall“. In: Berliner Morgenpost dated 26 September 2014.
 Schantall, tu ma die Omma winken! at the Schwarzkopf & Schwarzkopf Verlag.

21st-century German writers
German-language writers
Pulp fiction writers
German satirists
People from Gelsenkirchen
German merchants
1976 births
German male non-fiction writers
Living people